The International Congress on Buddhist Women's Role in the Sangha: Bhikshuni Vinaya and Ordination Lineages was an historic event that took place July 18–20, 2007.  It was a meeting of internationally recognized Buddhist scholars specializing in monastic discipline and history, as well as practitioners.  It was expected to be the final discussion of a decades-long dialogue about re-establishing full bhikshuni ordination in Buddhist traditions. Papers and research based on Buddhist texts and contemporary practice traditions in China, Korea, Taiwan, Tibet, and South Asia were presented, between them the Abstract: The Eight Garudhammas. The fourteenth Dalai Lama attended the final day of the conference and conclusions.  His letter of support is available to the public (see references below).

Discussions, amongst both scholars and practitioners, at the first Congress were planned primarily about the Tibetan Buddhist tradition. Other Bhikkshuni lineages which could be restored were also expected to be on the agenda. The Congress was held at University of Hamburg, Germany, July 18–20, 2007, hosted by the University of Hamburg's Asia-Africa Institute.

After statements from the many bhikkus and bhikkshunis present, the Dalai Lama announced that, while he supported the case, he needed to discuss the matter with senior lamas representing the different schools of Tibetan Buddhism to gain a consensus view. He added that from 2008 (or if possible 2007) nuns were to practice three monastic ceremonies, posadha, vassa and pavarana, as preparation for the establishment of a Bhikkhuni Sangha in the near future.  These, he declared, should be held in Tibetan and follow the dharmaguptaka vinaya. A full statement was issued by the Dalai Lama detailing this.

Bhikshuni and Yogini Tenzin Palmo -a member of the Committee of Western Bhikshunis-  belonging to Drukpa Lineage of the Kagyu school in her statement A brief overview of the situation for nuns in the Tibetan Tradition elaborated that  in spite of full Bhikshuni ordination monks had not to be afraid because according to vinaya they were going to keep their higher position.

The six member 'Committee of Western Bhikshunis' is an organisation of senior Western nuns supported by two Advisors from Taiwan
(Ven. Bhiksuni Heng-ching Shih, Professor of Philosophy at Taiwan National University (Gelongma ordination 1975 in San Francisco) and Ven. Bhikshuni Wu-yin, Vinaya Master). It was formed in the autumn of 2005, after the Dalai Lama told Bhikshuni Jampa Tsedroen that the Western bhikshunis should be more involved in helping to establish the bhikshuni ordination in the Tibetan tradition.

To help establish the Bhikshuni Sangha (community of fully ordained nuns) where it does not currently exist had already been declared in 1987 one of the objectives of Sakyadhita, as expressed at its founding meeting in 1987 in Bodhgaya, India.

The eight Garudhammas/Gurudharmas of the Bhikshuni Vinaya

	 
The basic difference between Bhikshuni Vinaya and Bhikshu Vinaya (= discipline) are the eight rules of respect, known as The Eight Garudhammas. According to scripture and legend they have come from Buddha Shakyamuni himself.
	 
Buddha: Ananda, if Mahapajapati Gotami accepts eight vows of respect, that will be her full ordination (upasampada).
	 
"(1) A bhikkhuni who has been fully ordained even for more than a century must bow down, rise up from her seat, salute with hands palm-to-palm over her heart, and perform the duties of respect to a bhikkhu even if he has been fully ordained only a day. This rule is to be honored, respected, revered, venerated, never to be transgressed as long as she lives."
	 
"(2)A bhikkhuni must not spend the rains in a residence where there is no bhikkhu...
	 
"(3) Every half-month a bhikkhuni should request two things from the Bhikkhu Sangha: she should ask for the date of the uposatha day and come for an exhortation...
	 
"(4) At the end of the Rains-residence, a bhikkhuni should invite (criticism both from) the Bhikkhu Sangha and the Bhikkhuni Sangha on any of three grounds: what they have seen, what they have heard, what they have suspected...
	 
"(5) A bhikkhuni who has broken any of the vows of respect must undergo penance for half a month under both Sanghas...
	 
"(6) Only after a probationer has trained in the six precepts for two years should she request ordination from both Sanghas...
	 
"(7) A bhikkhu must not in any way be insulted or reviled by a bhikkhuni...
	 
"(8) From this day forward, the admonition of a bhikkhu by a bhikkhuni is forbidden, but the admonition of a bhikkhuni by a bhikkhu is not forbidden. This rule, too, is to be honored, respected, revered, venerated, never to be transgressed as long as she lives.
	 
Buddha: "If Mahapajapati Gotami accepts these eight vows of respect, that will be her full ordination.".

Procedure of Women Ordination
Alexander Berzin states: "The ordination procedure involves asking the candidates a list of questions concerning impediments (bar-chad-kyi chos, Skt. antarayikadharma, Pali: antarayikadhamma) she may have that might hinder her from keeping the full set of vows. In addition to the questions asked in common with candidates for bhikshu ordination, these include further questions concerning her anatomy as a female."

Important quotations on equality of buddhist nuns
Equality of Full Ordination

taken from the interview with Bhikshuni Thubten Chodron, Committee of Western Bhikshunis

Discriminating against buddhist nuns within Full Ordination

taken from Berzin Summary Report

Equality generally speaking
taken from Berzin Summary Report

Impacts of bowing

A Painful Ambiguity - Attitudes towards nuns in Buddhist myth by Bhikkhu Sujato 25/9/2007

Giving joy to monks in order to foster openmindedness

Sister Chan Khong

See also
Bhikkhuni
Ordination of women in Buddhism
Sangha
Women in Buddhism
First buddhist council
Second buddhist council

References

Bibliography

External links
News on Bhikshuni Lineage in Tibetan tradition. - Yasodhara-Newsletter on International Buddhist Women's Activities Information referring to the 3rd Seminar of Vinaya Scholars about the Bhikshuni Lineage, organized by the Department of Religion and Culture, held in Dharamsala, India, May 22–24, 2006.
Regarding the Bhiksuni Order in Tibetan Buddhism - May 2007 an interview with Bhikshuni Thubten Chodron, founder and abbess of Sravasti Abbey, a monastery in the USA, and former resident teacher at Amitabha Buddhist Centre in Singapore, member of the Committee of Western Bhikshunis
Bhikkhuni says she is glum on future of ordination
A Summary Report of the 2007 International Congress on the Women's Role in the Sangha: Bhikshuni Vinaya and Ordination Lineages Study Buddhism (2007-08-00)
Information about Developments after the Congress
Buddhist order of interbeing - established in 1964
Order of Interbeing Beginnings (Sister Chân Không, Excerpt from her book Learning True Love) by Chan Khong
Buddhist Dharma on women
 WOMEN IN ZEN BUDDHISM: Chinese Bhiksunis in the Ch'an Tradition by Heng-Ching Shih (Advisor of Committee of Western Bhikshunis)

Buddhist monasticism
21st-century Buddhism
Ordination of women in Buddhism
Buddhist nuns
History of Tibetan Buddhism
Buddhist women's organizations
2007 in Germany
2007 conferences
2007 in religion
2000s in Hamburg